Rickey Ricardo Watts is a former American football wide receiver who played  five seasons in the National Football League (NFL) for the Chicago Bears.

References

1957 births
Living people
People from Longview, Texas
American football wide receivers
Tulsa Golden Hurricane football players
Chicago Bears players